"I'll Be Over You" is a hit single by the American rock band Toto. Released as the lead single from their 1986 album, Fahrenheit, the song reached number 11 on the Billboard Hot 100 chart in 1986. Lead vocals were sung by guitarist Steve Lukather, who co-wrote the song with hit songwriter Randy Goodrum (one of several collaborations between the two). Guest musician Michael McDonald provided the vocal counterpoint on the recording.

"I'll Be Over You" spent two weeks at number one on the Adult Contemporary chart, Toto's second song to top this chart (following 1983's "I Won't Hold You Back").

Composition
Lukather explained the song's lyrics: "What the song is basically saying is, the guy has broken up with a girl, and realized that he should never have broken up with this girl, and he's still really deeply in love with her. Sort of like a warning to people, like, you never know how good you got it until you don't have it anymore."

Reception
Cash Box said that "The wistful and emotional song should make a strong showing."

Music video
A music video (in which guest vocalist McDonald also appears) was shot with the band playing on an apartment rooftop until it rained. The rooftop is on top of the building located at 548 South Spring Street in Los Angeles, California, USA. The video also recreates the image from the front of the album with live actors.

Track listing
 "I'll Be Over You"
 "In a Word" - Non-album track, later released on Toto XX

Personnel
Toto
 Steve Lukather – lead and backing vocals, guitars
 Joseph Williams – backing vocals
 David Paich – Yamaha DX7 Rhodes, synthesizer
 Steve Porcaro – synthesizer
 Mike Porcaro – bass
 Jeff Porcaro – drums

Additional musicians
 Michael McDonald – backing vocals
 Lenny Castro – percussion
 Paulinho da Costa – percussion

Charts

Weekly

Year-end

Certifications

References

External links

See also
List of Hot Adult Contemporary number ones of 1986

1985 songs
1986 singles
Toto (band) songs
Columbia Records singles
Songs written by Randy Goodrum
Songs written by Steve Lukather